Perplicaria is a genus of sea snails, marine Gastropod mollusks in the family Cancellariidae, the nutmeg snails.

Species
Species within the genus Perplicaria include:
 † Perplicaria aquitanica (Peyrot, 1928) 
 Perplicaria boucheti Verhecken, 1997
 Perplicaria clarki M. Smith, 1947
 Perplicaria laurensii (Grateloup, 1832)
 † Perplicaria mioquadrata (Sacco, 1894) 
 † Perplicaria perplexa Dall, 1890

References

 Hemmen, J. (2007). Recent Cancellariidae. Annotated and illustrated catalogue of Recent Cancellariidae. Privately published, Wiesbaden. 428 pp.

External links
 Dall, W. H. (1890-1903). Contributions to the Tertiary fauna of Florida with especial reference to the Miocene silex-beds of Tampa and the Pliocene beds of the Caloosahatchie River. Transactions of the Wagner Free Institute of Science. 3(1)

Cancellariidae